The slender conger (Uroconger lepturus, also known as the longtail conger or the yellow pike-conger) is an eel in the family Congridae (conger/garden eels). It was described by John Richardson in 1845, originally under the genus Congrus. It is a marine, tropical eel which is known from the Indo-Western Pacific Ocean, including the Red Sea, South Africa, and Japan.

The slender conger's diet consists of small benthic crustaceans. It is of commercial interest to fisheries.

References

Congridae
Fish described in 1845